Le Rathvel is a small ski resort of the Swiss Prealps, located in the canton of Fribourg.

Geography 

Rathvel belongs to the municipality of Châtel-Saint-Denis. It is situated 5 km north of Les Paccots, another small ski resort.

Winter activities 

The ski pistes are situated on the eastern slopes of the Niremont. The maximal difference in altitude is approximately 300 m.

On Fridays, an 800-meter long piste is illuminated for night skiing.

Rathvel ski resort is particularly well-suited for beginners and children.

See also 

 Les Paccots
 List of ski areas and resorts in Europe

References

Swisstopo topographic maps

External links
Les Paccots and Region tourism office website
Rathvel website (in French)

Ski areas and resorts in Switzerland